Kelechi Nwakali(born 5 June 1998) is a Nigerian professional footballer who plays as a midfielder for Spanish club SD Ponferradina.

Club career

Arsenal
Nwakali started his career at the Diamond Football Academy. After his fine performances at the 2015 FIFA U-17 World Cup, in which he won the Golden Ball Award, he signed with English Premier League side Arsenal.

MVV Maastricht (loan)
On 16 September 2016, it was announced that Nwakali had signed for Eerste Divisie side MVV Maastricht on loan for the season. He then made his professional debut for the side the same day against Jong Ajax. He came on as a 92nd-minute substitute for Thomas Verheijdt as MVV won 1–0.

VVV-Venlo (loan)
On 29 August 2017, Nwakali joined Dutch side VVV-Venlo on loan for the first 6 months of the 2017–18 Eredivisie season. On 10 September 2017 Nwakali scored on his Eredivisie debut against FC Groningen, scoring a stoppage time equaliser in a 1–1 draw. After the initial six-month loan deal expired, Nwakali elected to leave Venlo and return to MVV Maastricht for the second half of the season.

Return to MVV Maastricht (loan)
On 24 January 2018, Nwakali returned to Maastricht on loan for the second half of the 2017–18 Eerste Divisie season, having played just 380 minutes of Eredivisie football with Venlo.

Porto B (loan)
Nwakali signed on loan for FC Porto on 18 July 2018, and was assigned to Porto B ahead of the 2018–19 LigaPro season.

In March 2019, he was stuck in Nigeria due to issues with his visa.

Huesca
On 2 September 2019, Nwakali joined Spanish Segunda División side SD Huesca on a three-year deal. After leaving the club he thanked Arsenal for his time with them, despite not making a first-team appearance.

Nwakali made his La Liga debut on 13 September 2020, in a 1–1 away draw against Villarreal CF. On 31 January of the following year, he was loaned to AD Alcorcón in the second division, for the remainder of the season.

On 5 April 2022, Nwakali's contract was terminated early. The following day Nwakali released an official statement through his official Twitter account denouncing his treatment by SD Huesca and the club's Sporting Director, Rubén García, starting in December 2021, by pressuring him not to attend the Africa Cup of Nations, for which he had been called up, paying his wages late, pressuring him to sign a new contract in order to get paid the wages he was owed, trying to force his transfer out of the club and, finally, suspending him and banning him from club trainings.

Ponferradina
On 21 July 2022, Nwakali signed for fellow Spanish second division side SD Ponferradina.

International career
Nwakali was named in the provisional squad for the Nigeria U17 side before the 2013 FIFA U-17 World Cup but did not make the final squad. However, coming into the 2015 U-17 World Cup he was named captain as he led his country to the title, winning the Golden Ball Award along the way. On Christmas day 2021 he was called up to Senior team that will participate in the 2021 Africa Cup of Nations in Cameroon which was postponed to 2022 because of the Covid-19 pandemic.

Career statistics

References

External links

1998 births
Living people
People from Owerri
Sportspeople from Imo State
Nigerian footballers
Association football forwards
Arsenal F.C. players
Eredivisie players
Eerste Divisie players
MVV Maastricht players
VVV-Venlo players
Liga Portugal 2 players
FC Porto B players
La Liga players
Segunda División players
SD Huesca footballers
AD Alcorcón footballers
SD Ponferradina players
Nigeria under-20 international footballers
Nigeria youth international footballers
Nigerian expatriate footballers
Nigerian expatriate sportspeople in England
Nigerian expatriate sportspeople in the Netherlands
Nigerian expatriate sportspeople in Spain
Expatriate footballers in England
Expatriate footballers in the Netherlands
Expatriate footballers in Spain
2021 Africa Cup of Nations players